Krisztina Goda (born 1970) is a Hungarian screenwriter and film director. She is best known for her 2006 film Children of Glory.

Selected filmography

References

External links
 

1968 births
Living people
Writers from Budapest
Hungarian screenwriters
Hungarian film directors
Hungarian women film directors